A vowel diagram or vowel chart is a schematic arrangement of the vowels. Depending on the particular language being discussed, it can take the form of a triangle or a quadrilateral. Vertical position on the diagram denotes the vowel closeness, with close vowels at the top of the diagram, and horizontal position denotes the vowel backness, with front vowels at the left of the diagram. Vowels are unique in that their main features do not contain differences in voicing, manner, or place (articulators). Vowels differ only in the position of the tongue when voiced. The tongue moves vertically and horizontally within the oral cavity. Vowels are produced with at least a part of their vocal tract obstructed.

In the vowel diagram, convenient reference points are provided for specifying tongue position. The position of the highest point of the arch of the tongue is considered to be the point of articulation of the vowel. The vertical dimension of the vowel diagram is known as vowel height, which includes high, central (mid), or low vowels. The horizontal dimension of the vowel diagram includes tongue advancement and identifies how far forward the tongue is located in the oral cavity during production. Vowels are also categorized by the tenseness or laxness of the tongue. The schwa  is in the center of the chart and is frequently referred to as the neutral vowel. Here, the vocal tract is in its neutral state and creates a near perfect tube. For other vowels, there is a necessary movement of the vocal tract and tongue away from the neutral position, either up/down or backward/forward. The next dimension for vowels are tense/lax; here we can distinguish high/mid/low dimensions and the front/central/back dimensions. In other words, all vowels but schwas.

The next dimension of vowels is rounding. Rounding is important because it continues to help differentiate the vowels of English. Vowels can be categorized as rounded or unrounded.

The vowel systems of most languages can be represented by vowel diagrams. Usually, there is a pattern of even distribution of marks on the chart, a phenomenon that is known as vowel dispersion. For most languages, the vowel system is triangular. Only 10% of languages, including English, have a vowel diagram that is quadrilateral. Such a diagram is called a vowel quadrilateral or a vowel trapezium.

Different vowels vary in pitch. Vowels are distinct from one another by their acoustic form or spectral properties. Spectral properties are the speech sound's fundamental frequency and its formants.

Each vowel in the vowel diagram has a unique first and second formant, or F1 and F2. The frequency of the first formant refers to the width of the pharyngeal cavity and the position of the tongue on a vertical axis and ranges from open to close. The frequency of the second formant refers to the length of the oral cavity and the position of the tongue on a horizontal axis. The F2 frequency is higher for  because the oral cavity is short and the tongue is at the front of the mouth. The F2 frequency is low in the production of [u] because the mouth is elongated and the lips are rounded while the pharynx is lowered.

The IPA vowel chart has the cardinal vowels and is displayed in the form of a trapezium. By definition, no vowel sound can be plotted outside of the IPA trapezium because its four corners represent the extreme points of articulation.

The vowel diagrams of most real languages are not so extreme. In English, for example, high vowels are not as high as the corners of the IPA trapezium, and front vowels are not as front.

IPA vowel diagram with added material

The official vowel chart of the International Phonetic Alphabet does not include vowel symbols with added diacritics as shown here, and only gives labels for the heights "close", "close-mid", "open-mid", and "open" (shown here in bold).

See also 
IPA vowel chart with audio 
IPA pulmonic consonant chart with audio

References 

Phonology
Phonetics